The 2013 Ladies European Tour is a series of golf tournaments for elite female golfers from around the world, which takes place from February through December, 2013. The tournaments are sanctioned by the Ladies European Tour (LET).

At present, the tour is scheduled to feature a total of 24 events, including the return of the Ladies Italian Open, which hasn't been on the tour since 2009. It also features the bi-annual Europe vs. USA Solheim Cup, which will rotate its turn to the United States for 2013. Also added to the tour is the Helsingborg Open in Sweden.

Leaving the tour for 2013 are the Deutsche Bank Ladies Swiss Open (Switzerland), the Ladies Irish Open (Ireland), and the UNIQA Ladies Golf Open (Austria).

The tour has chronologically moved some of the events. Moving upwards on the calendar are the South African Women's Open by three months, and the Open de España Femenino by three months. Moving back on the calendar are the Honma Pilsen Golf Masters by two months, The Evian Championship by two months, and the Aberdeen Asset Management Ladies Scottish Open by three months.

Schedule
The table below shows the 2013 schedule. The numbers in brackets after the winners' names indicate the career wins on the Ladies European Tour, including that event, and is only shown for members of the tour.

Key

Order of Merit rankings

External links
Official site of the Ladies European Tour
Ladies European Tour Information Centre

Ladies European Tour
Ladies European Tour
Ladies European Tour